WNE may refer to:

Western New England University
West Nile virus encephalitis
Wilnecote railway station, station code WNE
Wingello railway station, station code WNE